Boris Juraga was an American art director. He won an Academy Award in the category Best Art Direction for the film Cleopatra.

Selected filmography
 Cleopatra (1963)

References

External links

Year of birth missing
Possibly living people
American art directors
Best Art Direction Academy Award winners